John Alagía is an American record producer, composer, mixer and co-founder of Drive Music. Alagia has worked with artists including Lukas Nelson, Paul Simon, Herbie Hancock, Dave Matthews, John Mayer, Jason Mraz, Serena Ryder, Brett Dennen, Rachael Yamagata, Ben Folds, Lifehouse and many others.

In his early years, Alagía honed his recording and production skills with friend Douglas Derryberry at Rutabaga Studios in Arlington, Virginia. Derryberry and Alagía were also an acoustic rock duo, having released three albums and done extensive touring along the East Coast. Together, they recorded and produced many Mid-Atlantic acts ranging from DMB, Vertical Horizon, Edwin McCain to Ben Folds Five and others. Today, John resides at the Village Recorder in West Los Angeles.

Derryberry and Alagía
John was a member of a band known as Derryberry and Alagía. This collaboration featured Doug Derryberry. The group released three records, as follows:
Reinvigorating the Wheel
Rutabaga Stew
Southpaw

Partial discography

Ben Folds Five

Various Live Recordings
Naked Baby Photos
Space Reels
Tom and Mary

Blue Man Group
The Complex - Billboard Top 200 peak - #60

BoDeans
American Made (2012)

Brett Dennen
Hope For The Hopeless

Dave Matthews Band
The Central Park Concert - Billboard Top 200 peak - #14
Busted Stuff - Billboard Top 200 peak - #1
Grey Street - Top 40 singles peak - #18
Listener Supported - Billboard Top 200 peak - #15
Live in Chicago 12.19.98 - Billboard Top 200 peak - #6
Live at Folsom Field, Boulder, Colorado - Billboard Top 200 peak - #9
Live at Red Rocks 8.15.95
Remember Two Things
Recently
Under the Table and Dreaming
Crash
Before These Crowded Streets - additional pre-production (Produced by Steve Lillywhite)
Live at Red Rocks
Weekend On the Rocks
Eh Hee
Walk Around The Moon

David Gray
Live at Joe's Pub

The Hogwaller Ramblers
The Hogwaller Ramblers, 1998

Josh Kelley
For the Ride Home - Billboard Top 200 peak - #159
Amazing - Top 40 singles peak - #8

John Mayer
Room for Squares (2001) - Billboard Top 200 peak - #8
Any Given Thursday (2003) - Billboard Top 200 peak - #17
"No Such Thing" - Billboard Hot 100 singles peak - #13
"Your Body Is a Wonderland" (2002) - Billboard Hot 100 singles peak - #18
"Why Georgia" (2003) - Billboard Adult Top 40 singles peak - #8
Continuum - Billboard Top 200 peak - #2

Jason Mraz
You and I Both - Top 40 singles peak - #15
Waiting for My Rocket to Come Billboard Top 200 peak - #55
The Remedy (2003) - Top 40 singles peak - #4

Evermore
Dreams (2004) - ARIA certified Platinum
Real Life (2006) - ARIA certified Platinum

Lifehouse
Self-titled (2005) - Gold

Mandy Moore
Wild Hope (2007) Billboard Top 200 peak - #30

Once Hush 
 Say It Anyway (1996)

Vertical Horizon
Running on Ice (1995)
Live Stages (1997)

Rachael Yamagata
Happenstance (2004)
 Chesapeake (2011)
 Tightrope Walker (2016)

Ben Lee
Ripe (2007)

Liz Phair
Somebody's Miracle (2005)- Billboard Top 200 peak - #46

Katharine McPhee
 Unbroken (January 5, 2010) - Billboard Top 200 peak - #27

Madi Diaz
 Plastic Moon (2010)

Terra Naomi
 To Know I'm OK (2011)

Lena Fayre
 I am Not A Man (2014)

References

External links
 
 August 1, 2005 interview with MIX magazine

Year of birth missing (living people)
Living people
Record producers from Kentucky
Musicians from Louisville, Kentucky